White Night Wedding is a 2008 Icelandic film directed by Baltasar Kormákur.  The bittersweet comedy, about the never-ending search for love and happiness, takes place in Flatey, Breiðafjörður, western Iceland. The film is loosely based on the play Ivanov by Anton Chekhov.

Plot
The film opens with a wedding rehearsal at a small church in an isolated barren landscape. At the altar groom-to-be Jón, a middle-aged literature professor, is repeatedly interrupted by the ringing of his cell phone, much to the minister's annoyance. The present narrative alternates with flashbacks that depict the disintegration of Jón's first marriage to sensitive artist Anna. Jón's new bride-to-be, Thóra, is a former student half his age, which triggers disapproval by some, including his future in-laws.  As preparations for the wedding unfold during the "white nights" (the shortest nights of the year, when it is never fully dark), the reason for Jón's increasing reluctance to marry is revealed: he and Anna visited the same spot a year earlier, and she died in an accident after she found Jón and Thóra making love. The marriage finally takes place, and Jón and Thóra settle down to a life very much like the one he had with Anna.

Cast
 Hilmir Snær Guðnason as Jón
 Margrét Vilhjálmsdóttir as Anna
 Laufey Elíasdóttir as Thóra
 Þröstur Leó Gunnarsson as Börkur
 Jóhann Sigurðsson as Lárus
 Ólafía Hrönn Jónsdóttir as Sísí
 Ólafur Darri Ólafsson as Sjonni
 Ilmur Kristjánsdóttir as Matthildur
 Ólafur Egill Egilsson as Ólafur the elder

Critical reception
White Night Wedding was nominated for the 2008 Nordic Council Film Prize and it was selected as the Icelandic entry for the Best Foreign Language Film at the 81st Academy Awards. It received seven Edda Awards in 2008:
Best film
Best actor
Best supporting actor (Þröstur Leó Gunnarsson)
Best supporting actress (Ólafía Hrönn Jónsdóttir)
Best cinematographer: Bergsteinn Björgúlfsson
Best costumes: Helga I. Stefánsdáttir
Best set design: Grétar Reynísson and Atli Geir Grétarsson

References

External links 
 

Icelandic comedy films
Films directed by Baltasar Kormákur
Films set in Iceland
Films about weddings